Chandler Kinchla, better known as Chan Kinchla, (born May 29, 1969) is a Canadian-American musician best known as the guitarist for the jam band Blues Traveler.

Early life 
Kinchla was born in Hamilton, Ontario, Canada. Kinchla is the older brother of Blues Traveler bassist Tad Kinchla. He attended Princeton High School in Princeton, New Jersey, where he started playing guitar with John Popper in 1986. Kinchla was one of the two original members of the band. While still in high school, the band gigged in New York City often. After graduation, they moved there and played at "divey, shit-hole bars" until they secured a record deal with A&M.

Career 
After their record deal, a bartender at one of the clubs they played at had a job with David Letterman and introduced the band to him. Blues Traveler appeared on The David Letterman Show as their first national television event. Kinchla "think[s] of Dave fondly as the guy who gave us our first break, as far as some national television exposure". The band released their first album in 1990.

Chan along with Brendan Hill are the only members of Blues Traveler who do not participate in a side project, although Chan and John Popper do acoustic shows together.

Guitars 
Chan has used a wide variety of guitars throughout his career, including Gibson, Fender, ESP, and Yamaha guitars. In recent years, Chan has played Paul Reed Smith guitars as they have a custom model created for him.

References

External links
Chan Kinchla's bio - BluesTraveler.com
 

1969 births
Musicians from Hamilton, Ontario
Canadian blues guitarists
Canadian male guitarists
Canadian rock guitarists
Living people
Grammy Award winners
Blues Traveler members